The 2016 ASUN men's soccer tournament, the 38th edition of the tournament, determined the ASUN Conference's automatic berth into the 2016 NCAA Division I Men's Soccer Championship..

This was the first tournament held under the conference's current branding as the ASUN Conference. The league had been known as the Atlantic Sun Conference since 2002.

Qualification 

The top six teams in the ASUN Conference, based on their conference regular-season records, qualified for the tournament.

Bracket

Schedule

First round

Semifinals

Championship

Statistics

All-Tournament team 

 Albert Ruiz, FGCU - MVP 
 Eli Roubos, FGCU
 Miguel Jaime, FGCU
 Kamar Marriott, FGCU
 Patrick Harding, Jacksonville
 Kai Bennett, Jacksonville
 Allan Morgan, Jacksonville
 Joe Kerridge, Lipscomb
 Logan Paynter, Lipscomb
 Sylvester Szczesniewicz, North Florida
 Jay Bolt, North Florida

See also 
 Atlantic Sun Conference
 2016 Atlantic Sun Conference men's soccer season
 2016 NCAA Division I men's soccer season
 2016 NCAA Division I Men's Soccer Championship

References 

ASUN Men's Soccer Tournament
Atlantic Sun Conference Men's Soccer